Byculla (station code: BY) is railway station on the Central line of the Mumbai Suburban Railway. It is located in the neighbourhood of Byculla.  

The station is a Grade-I heritage structure. The other 4 railway stations on Mumbai's heritage list include Chhatrapati Shivaji Maharaj Terminus, Western Railways Headquarters Building (Churchgate), Bandra railway station and Reay Road railway station.  

All the fast trains halt at Byculla station both during peak hours and normal time.

Etymology
The name Byculla appears to have derived from word Bhay(Marathi:भाय = Bawa) & khala(Marathi:खळा = area to store grains), Meaning Priest's Grain storage.

History
Byculla was one of the original stations when the Bombay–Thane railway was inaugurated in April 1853.  It had been built as a wooden structure the year before, but took on its current form in 1857.
The first locomotive was brought to Mumbai through street of Byculla and around 200 laborers pulled it.

Byculla is a WiFi Station

Central Railway has install WiFi on platform 1 & 2. It has become helpful for many navigator people for navigation.

References

Railway stations in India opened in 1853
Mumbai CST-Kalyan rail line
Railway stations in Mumbai City district
Mumbai Suburban Railway stations